En blekt blondins ballader is a compilation album by Eva Dahlgren which contains her ballad hit songs between 1980-2005, released on 4 July 2007.

Track listing
Music and lyrics by Eva Dahlgren except: "När en vild röd ros slår ut doftar hela skogen", with music composed by Anders Hillborg.
Bara ibland
Guldlock
Blackheart
Vem tänder stjärnorna?
Guldgrävarsång
Du
Skönheten och befriaren
Mitt liv
Egoism
Ängeln i rummet
Lev så
Sand
Jorden är ett litet rum
Det som bär mig nu
Kanske för minnenas skull
När en vild röd ros slår ut doftar hela skogen

Charts

References 

2007 compilation albums
Compilation albums by Swedish artists
Eva Dahlgren albums